Dolores Dwyer (married name Duffy; December 25, 1934 – October 29, 2011) was an American sprinter. She competed in the Women's 200 metres event at the 1952 Summer Olympics. In her later life, she became an actress, which included   recurring role as Iris Puffybush on the Comedy Central series Strangers With Candy and its subsequent film adaptation, and a role in the television show Sex and the City.

References

External links
 
 

1934 births
2011 deaths
Athletes (track and field) at the 1952 Summer Olympics
American female sprinters
Olympic track and field athletes of the United States
American television actresses
Track and field athletes from New York (state)
20th-century American actresses
21st-century American actresses
Pan American Games medalists in athletics (track and field)
Pan American Games gold medalists for the United States
Athletes (track and field) at the 1951 Pan American Games
USA Outdoor Track and Field Championships winners
USA Indoor Track and Field Championships winners
Medalists at the 1951 Pan American Games
Olympic female sprinters